Thomas "Sturdy" Maxwell (born circa 1898) was a Scottish football forward who played in Scotland, England and the United States.

Career
Maxwell began his senior career with Clyde in 1917. In 1921, he took part in a 'Scotland' tour of North America organised by Third Lanark. At the time he played club football for Dunfermline Athletic who were playing in the Central League. Maxwell played in a game against Canada during the tour on 9 July 1921; this was not officially an international and therefore he did not receive a cap. In October 1921, Maxwell signed with Arsenal, but played only one Football League game and then moved back to Scotland, playing briefly for Dunfermline again and also going on trial with Aberdeen.

In January 1923, Maxwell signed with Bethlehem Steel of the American Soccer League. He played three seasons with Bethlehem, winning the 1924 American Cup with them. In March 1924, he was ejected from the Easter final of the 1923-24 National Challenge Cup for an altercation with Alec Lorimer. In 1925, Bethlehem released Maxwell who signed with the New Bedford Whalers. In 1928, Maxwell began the season with the Whalers. In October 1928, the Whalers briefly moved to the Eastern Soccer League, then rejoined the American Soccer League a few games later. During this turmoil, Maxwell left the Whalers and joined Centennial of the ESL. On 31 December 1928, the Centennials loaned Maxwell to Bethlehem Steel for one league game. In March 1929, Philadelphia sent Maxwell to Bethlehem Steel.

External links

References

1890s births
Year of birth missing
Year of death missing
American Soccer League (1921–1933) players
Scottish Football League players
English Football League players
Arsenal F.C. players
Bethlehem Steel F.C. (1907–1930) players
Clyde F.C. players
Dunfermline Athletic F.C. players
Dumbarton Harp F.C. players
Dumbarton F.C. players
Eastern Professional Soccer League (1928–29) players
New Bedford Whalers players
Philadelphia Centennials (soccer) players
Scottish footballers
Scottish expatriate footballers
Expatriate soccer players in the United States
Association football forwards
Scottish expatriate sportspeople in the United States